The 2009–10 Liga Gimel season saw 91 clubs competing in 7 regional divisions for promotion to Liga Bet. This was the first season since 1998–99 that Liga Gimel was the fifth tier in the Israeli football league system.

Hapoel Shefa-'Amr (Upper Galilee), F.C. Kfar Kama (Jezreel), F.C. Givat Olga (Samaria), Maccabi Bnei Jaljulia (Sharon), Hapoel Oranit (Tel Aviv), Bnei Yichalel Rehovot (Central) and Hapoel Katamon Jerusalem (South) all won their respective divisions and were promoted to Liga Bet.

During the summer, as several vacancies were created in Liga Bet, runners-up Bnei Kabul (Upper Galilee) and Maccabi Daliyat al-Karmel (Samaria) were also promoted to Liga Bet, as well as third-placed Ironi Nesher (Samaria).

Upper Galilee Division

Bnei Kabul competed with Maccabi Daliyat al-Karmel from the Samaria division for a vacant spot in Liga Bet, and lost the match 1–3. After the match another spot became available in Liga Bet, and Bnei Kabul was promoted as well.

Jezreel Division

Samaria Division

Maccabi Daliyat al-Karmel competed with Bnei Kabul from the Upper Galilee division for a vacant spot in Liga Bet, and promoted after winning the match 3–1.

Sharon Division

Tel Aviv Division

Central Division

South Division

During the season, Hapoel Bnei Beit Safafa and Hapoel Hura (both after 2 matches) folded and their results were annulled.

References
Liga Gimel Upper Galilee The Israel Football Association 
Liga Gimel Jezreel The Israel Football Association 
Liga Gimel Samaria The Israel Football Association 
Liga Gimel Sharon The Israel Football Association 
Liga Gimel Tel Aviv The Israel Football Association 
Liga Gimel Central The Israel Football Association 
Liga Gimel South The Israel Football Association 

Liga Gimel seasons
5
Israel